India has participated at the 2019 Summer Universiade in Naples, Italy.

Dutee Chand became the first Indian women sprinter to win gold at the World Universiade championship, clocking 11.32 seconds in the 100m race.

References

2019
Nations at the 2019 Summer Universiade
2019 in Indian sport